Robert Serber (March 14, 1909 – June 1, 1997) was an American physicist who participated in the Manhattan Project. Serber's lectures explaining the basic principles and goals of the project were printed and supplied to all incoming scientific staff, and became known as The Los Alamos Primer. The New York Times called him “the intellectual midwife at the birth of the atomic bomb.”

Early life and education
He was born in Philadelphia, the eldest son of Rose (Frankel) and David Serber. His family was Jewish. His mother died in 1922 and his father married her cousin Frances Leof in 1928. Robert Serber earned his BS in engineering physics from Lehigh University in 1930 and earned his PhD in physics from the University of Wisconsin–Madison with John Van Vleck in 1934. He married Charlotte Leof (26 Jul 1911 – 1967), the daughter of his stepmother's uncle, in 1933.

Shortly before receiving his doctorate, Serber was selected for a National Research Council postdoctoral fellowship and planned on conducting research at Princeton University with Eugene Wigner. However, after spontaneously enrolling at the University of Michigan's physics summer school, he changed his plans and went to work with J. Robert Oppenheimer at the University of California, Berkeley. For the next four years, he shuttled with Oppenheimer between Berkeley and the California Institute of Technology, where Oppenheimer held a secondary faculty appointment. In 1938, he took one of the era's few tenure-track professorships in physics at the University of Illinois at Urbana–Champaign, where he stayed until he was recruited for the Manhattan Project.

Manhattan Project
He was recruited for the Manhattan Project in 1941, and was in Project Alberta on the dropping of the bomb. When the Los Alamos National Laboratory was first organized, Oppenheimer decided not to compartmentalize the technical information among different departments. This increased the effectiveness of the technical workers in problem solving, and emphasized the urgency of the project in their minds, now they knew what they were working on. So it fell to Serber to give a series of lectures explaining the basic principles and goals of the project. These lectures were printed and supplied to all incoming scientific staff, and became known as The Los Alamos Primer, LA-1. It was declassified in 1965. Serber developed the first good theory of bomb assembly hydrodynamics.

Serber's wife Charlotte Serber was appointed by Oppenheimer to head the technical library at Los Alamos, where she was the only wartime female section leader.

Serber created the code-names for all three design projects, the "Little Boy" (uranium gun), "Thin Man" (plutonium gun), and "Fat Man" (plutonium implosion), according to his reminiscences (1998). The names were based on their design shapes; the "Thin Man" would be a very long device, and the name came from the Dashiell Hammett detective novel and series of movies of the same name; the "Fat Man" bomb would be round and fat and was named after Sydney Greenstreet's character in The Maltese Falcon (from Hammett's novel). "Little Boy" would come last and be named only to contrast to the "Thin Man" bomb. This differs from the unsupported theory, now abandoned, that "Fat Man" was named after Churchill and "Thin Man" after Roosevelt (see Links).

Serber was to go on the camera plane for the Nagasaki mission, "Big Stink", but it left without him when group operations officer Major James I. Hopkins ordered him off the plane as he had forgotten his parachute, reportedly after the B-29 had already taxied onto the runway. Since Serber was the only crew member who knew how to operate the high-speed camera, Hopkins had to be instructed by radio from Tinian on its use. Serber was with the first American team to enter Hiroshima and Nagasaki to assess the results of the atomic bombing of the two cities.

Post-war work and personal life
Although Oppenheimer sought an appointment for Serber in the Berkeley physics department following the end of the war, this was soon forestalled, possibly because of the anti-Semitism of department chair Raymond Thayer Birge. Birge had previously refused to offer a tenure-track appointment to Serber after he received his University of Illinois offer, opining that "one Jew in the department is enough." Oppenheimer prevailed in placing him as head of the theoretical division of the Berkeley Radiation Laboratory under Ernest Lawrence; however, as his mentor segued into policy consultancies and the presidency of the Institute for Advanced Study in 1947, Serber frequently took over his courses, ultimately resulting in his appointment to the Berkeley faculty.

In 1948, Serber had to defend himself against anonymous accusations of disloyalty, mostly because his wife Charlotte's family were Jewish intellectuals with socialist leanings, and also because he tried to remove politics from discussions of the feasibility of the fusion bomb, leading to arguments with Edward Teller. Although he had been cleared of any potential wrongdoing at a subsequent hearing that year, he was denied a prerequisite security clearance for a Japanese physics conference in 1952, precipitating his refusal to join a Teller-chaired Department of Defense advisory group.

While he reluctantly signed the loyalty oath stipulated by the Levering Act for Berkeley personnel in 1950, growing antagonism between Oppenheimer and the more conservative Lawrence eventually spurred his departure. In 1951, he became a professor of physics at Columbia University at the behest of Manhattan Project colleague I. I. Rabi. He served as chair of the department from 1975 until his retirement as professor emeritus in 1978.

At Columbia, Serber served as doctoral advisor to future Nobelist Leon Cooper. He also collaborated with Abraham Pais on meson studies and developed the Serber-Dancoff method, a refined technique for analyzing strong coupling. He also consulted numerous labs, businesses, and commissions, including Brookhaven National Laboratory (where he worked one day a week during the academic year and occasional summers for twenty years) and Fermilab, as a specialist in the proton–proton chain reaction and the focusing properties of particle accelerators. Although largely bereft of any ideology, he refused to join the Defense Department-affiliated JASON consulting group because of his previous clearance issues and opposition to the Vietnam War.

After being diagnosed with Parkinson’s disease, Charlotte Serber suffered from depression and took her own life with an overdose of sleeping pills on May 22, 1967. In the years thereafter, he began a relationship with the widowed Kitty Oppenheimer. She talked him into buying a  yawl, which they sailed from New York to Grenada. In 1972, they purchased a  ketch, with the intention of sailing through the Panama Canal and to Japan via the Galapagos Islands and Tahiti during Serber's sabbatical. They set out, but Kitty became ill, and was taken to Gorgas Hospital, where she died of an embolism on October 27, 1972. Serber and Toni Oppenheimer scattered her cremains near the Oppenheimers' longtime vacation home in Saint John, U.S. Virgin Islands, which he continued to use.

Following his retirement, he married Fiona St. Clair, a fabric designer from Saint Thomas, U.S. Virgin Islands, in 1979. He adopted her son Zachariah, and they had another son, William, in November 1980.

He served as president of the American Physical Society in 1971. A year later, Serber was awarded the J. Robert Oppenheimer Memorial Prize.

Serber appears in the Oscar-nominated documentary The Day After Trinity (1980). In the 1989 movie dramatization of the Manhattan Project, Fat Man and Little Boy, he was portrayed by H. David Politzer, a professor of theoretical physics at Caltech. Politzer was awarded the Nobel Prize in Physics in 2004.

Serber died June 1, 1997 at his home in Manhattan from complications of surgery for brain cancer.

Bibliography

 Original 1943 "LA-1", declassified in 1965, plus commentary and historical introduction.

 Robert Serber 1909—1997 A Biographical Memoir by Robert P. Crease, 2008, National Academy of Sciences, Washington.

References

Further reading

External links
1994 Audio Interview with Robert Serber by Richard Rhodes Voices of the Manhattan Project
1982 Audio Interview with Robert Serber by Martin Sherwin Voices of the Manhattan Project
Annotated bibliography for Robert Serber from the Alsos Digital Library for Nuclear Issues 
Naming of Fat Man & Thin Man after Churchill, Roosevelt? 
 Oral History interview transcript with Robert Serber 26 November 1996, American Institute of Physics, Niels Bohr Library and Archives 
 Oral History interview transcript with Robert Serber 10 February 1967, American Institute of Physics, Niels Bohr Library and Archives 
 Eyewitness Account of the Trinity Test

1909 births
1997 deaths
20th-century American Jews
20th-century American physicists
Manhattan Project people
Central High School (Philadelphia) alumni
Lehigh University alumni
University of Wisconsin–Madison College of Letters and Science alumni
University of California, Berkeley faculty
University of Illinois Urbana-Champaign faculty
Columbia University faculty
Jewish American scientists
People associated with the atomic bombings of Hiroshima and Nagasaki
Deaths from brain cancer in the United States
Deaths from cancer in New York (state)
Presidents of the American Physical Society
Fellows of the American Physical Society
Scientists from Philadelphia